Sundarrajan is a South Indian surname. Notable people with the surname include:

 Major Sundarrajan (1935–2003), Tamil actor
 R. Sundarrajan (born 1950), Tamil director and actor
 R. Sundarrajan (died 2020), Indian politician

Indian surnames